Onggi is Korean earthenware extensively used as tableware and storage containers in Korea. It includes both unglazed earthenware, fired near 600 to 700°C, and pottery with a dark brown glaze fired at over 1100 °C.The origin of onggi dates to around 4000 to 5000 BCE. The types of earthenware include patternless, mumun, and a red and black variety. The patternless earthenware is made with lumps of clay and fine sand. The predecessor of Goryeo celadon and Joseon white porcelain, the black/red earthenware excludes any sand in its creation process. The earthenware's color is determined by both the iron content of the clay and the method used to fire it. The modern onggi shape dates back from the Joseon era. Many records about onggi are found in Sejong Sillok Jiriji ("King Sejong's Treatise on Geography"), which includes further details about Korean pottery: "There are three kilns that make the yellow onggi in Chogye-gun and Jinju-mok, Gyeongsang Province".

History  
Ong (옹) (甕, 瓮) is the Korean word for "pottery" and refers to the form of the bowl.

Pottery has been used on the Korean peninsula since prehistoric times for food storage. In the Three Kingdoms period, images of large and small pottery appear on the murals of Anak Tomb No. 3 in Goguryeo, and in Baekje, and Silla. Records indicate that they were used to store rice, liquor, oil, soy sauce, and salted fish. Onggi was also commonly used to preserve drinking water. In the early Joseon dynasty period, there were 104 'Ongjang (옹장)' in fourteen institutions such as the Bongsung temple, and there were two assistants according to ≪Ggyeong-guk Dae-jeon(경국대전)≫ in Joseon. In Sung-Hyun's ≪선화봉사 고려도경 宣和奉使高麗圖經≫, "Pottery is the most necessary vessel for people. Now, in Mapo and Noryangjin, mud baking is done as a clay pot, a kind of earthenware. " Showcasing how the pottery has been used in everyday life since prehistoric times.

Uses
Onggi has a more microporous structure than porcelain, and has been found to help the fermentation process. It is used in the preparation of gochujang (fermented chili pepper, bean and rice paste), doenjang (fermented bean paste), kimchi (fermented seasoned vegetables), and soy sauce. With proper porosity and permeability, onggi can give an optimally ripe quality to fermented foods. Fine-tuned onggi containers are highly suitable for various kinds of fermented products.

Korea has always been known for fermented foods. As found in ancient Chinese historiography, specifically biographies on Wuhuan, Xianbei, and Dongyi, a section of the Records of the Three Kingdoms (The Records of The Wèi ) remarks: "Goguryeo people have a custom of making fermented foods".

The abundance of soybeans, which grow naturally in Korea, fresh resources from the sea surrounding the Korean Peninsula, and a proper climate for microbial development all play a significant factor in the importance and usage of fermentation for food processing. The development and refinement of onggi ware contributed to the development of fermented dishes in Korean cuisine. Large onggi ware were typically stored on a jangdokdae, an elevated floor near the house.

Features
Onggi, made by a specialized group of workmen called onggijang, have been largely influenced by the characteristics and climate of the regions where they were made. As a result, the shape, size, and manufacturing method of onggi vary from region to region. Nevertheless, onggi types share similarities: biodegradability, porosity, resistance to rot, as well as firmness or "vertebration". Due to the low firing temperatures often used in producing onggi, they are archaeologically rarely found as the sherds eventually return to its former clay state or are used as grog. Features of Onggi include its breathability, stability, suitability for fermentation, economical price, porosity, and diverse usage.

When heated to high temperature, the wall of the pottery vessel discharges the crystal water it contains, generating pores that allow the air to flow between the inside and the outside. For this reason, Onggi has been recognized as a breathable vessel from an ancient period of time.

Suitability for fermentation 
The most significant characteristic of Korean cuisine is its use of fermented food, utilizing onggi pots for the fermentation process. Other foods and items can also be stored in containers originally meant for fermentation, such as tobacco, candlesticks, and cooked rice.

Since the materials to make Onggi can be easily and cheaply obtained, Onggi has traditionally retailed at a low price, making it obtainable for the lower and middle class.

Porosity
Before firing, the onggijang master glazes its surface. This glaze plays a key role in providing a waterproof surface and preventing leaks. Afterwards, a large amount sand particles are added to the body of the clay, acting as passages for air. This way, air can freely move through the pottery while any water cannot- Koreans call this action "Onggi drawing breath." This is one of the most ideal reasons to use onggi when making Korean fermented foods.

Variety of usage 
While onggi are mainly used as food containers, they can also be used to store household appliances such as lamps, fireplaces, ashtrays, coins, and ink pads, as well as ceremonial instruments and percussion instruments such as cans, onion jugs, and wind instruments.

Production method 
Onggi pots are made of clay that contains a high percentage of iron. First, the soil to make the pottery is put into the water and whipped out to remove sand and impurities. Once the water is removed from the resulting fine sediment, it is formed into a bowl which is then dried out in the sun. The potter dries the dried-up bowl again in the sun, washes it with a lye solution, then dries it again. The glaze that is applied to the bowl is mixed with various substances before being sifted through a sieve. After the glaze is applied to the bowl, an orchid or grass pattern is drawn on the body and the pot is air-dried thoroughly, baked in a kiln, and finished.

Another process of making Onggi is to first knead the soil, dry it in the shade, cut it with a tool to form a brick shape, and then smack it on the ground into a plank shape. This is referred to as Panzhangjil (판장질). Afterwards, it is placed onto a wheel and ironed (batting) with a Ddukmae (떡매). The shape of the Onggi is determined by the speed and hand movements of the wheel. Since the pottery culture seemed likely to disappear after the 1960s, due to the appearance of plastic and stainless steel bowls, the Ministry of Culture designated the Onggi Human Cultural Property in May 1989. In 1990, Onggijang (Onggi technician) was designated as Important Intangible Cultural Properties No. 96.

See also

References

Literature
Changwon Jeonmun Daehak 창원전문대학 [Changwon College], "Balhyosikpumui pumjire michineun onggiui mulseongpyeongga" 발효식품의 품질에 미치는 옹기의 물성평가 [Property evaluation of onggi on the quality of fermented food]. Nongnimbu, 2004
Jeong Byeongrak. 옹기와의대화 [Conversation with Onggi]. Dongkwang Publisher 동광출판사. 1998. .
Lee Hoonseok and Chung Yangmo. Onggi. Daewonsa. 1993. .
Moon Yongrin 문용린 and Oh Hyeonseok 오현석, "A study on the actual state of scarce resources and the extinctive process", Gyoyuk Gwahak Gisulbu 교육기술과학부. [Ministry of Education, Science and Technology], 2004

External links

 Ulsan onggi festival
 Oegosan onggi village (Ulsan)

Korean pottery
Korean food preparation utensils
Cooking vessels
Serving vessels
Containers